Paradise Place is a 1977 Swedish drama film directed by Gunnel Lindblom. Birgitta Valberg won the award for Best Actress at the 13th Guldbagge Awards.

Cast
 Marianne Aminoff as Christina
 Maria Blomkvist as Eva
 Anna Borg as Kajsa
 Margaretha Byström as Annika (as Margareta Byström)
 Agneta Ekmanner as Sassa
 Pontus Gustafsson as Tomas
 Mats Helander as Andreas
 Inga Landgré as Saga
 Dagny Lind as Alma
 Oscar Ljung as Arthur
 Holger Löwenadler as Wilhelm
 Toni Magnusson as King
 Per Myrberg as Ture
 Gösta Prüzelius as Carl-Henrik
 Sif Ruud as Emma
 Göran Stangertz as Puss
 Solveig Ternström as Ingrid
 Birgitta Valberg as Katha

References

External links
 
 

1977 films
1977 drama films
Swedish drama films
1970s Swedish-language films
1970s Swedish films